Chongqing–Huaihua railway or Yuhuai railway, is a single-track, electrified railroad in southwest China between Chongqing Municipality and Huaihua in Hunan Province. Cities and towns along route include Changshou, Fuling, Wulong, Pengshui, Qianjiang, Youyang Tujia and Miao Autonomous County, Xiushan, Songtao in Chongqing Municipality, Tongren in Guizhou Province and Huaihua in Hunan Province.

The Chongqing–Huaihua railway was one of the 10 major projects in the Chinese government's campaign to develop western regions in 2000.  The completion of the line shortened railway travel time from Chongqing to Zhangjiajie from 16 hours to 8 hours.

History
In September 2009, construction began on a second track for the Yuhuai railway between Fuling and Chongqing. This work was completed and put into use on 28 December 2013.

Double-tracking of the entire line was completed in December 2020.

Rail junctions
 Chongqing: Xiangfan–Chongqing railway, Chengdu–Chongqing railway, Sichuan–Guizhou railway
Fuling: Nanchuan–Fuling railway
 Qianjiang District: Qianjiang–Changde railway
 Huaihua: Shanghai–Kunming railway, Jiaozuo–Liuzhou railway

See also

 List of railways in China

References

2005 establishments in China
Railway lines opened in 2005
Railway lines in China
Rail transport in Chongqing